Camas Valley Charter School is a public charter school in Camas Valley, Oregon, United States. It is the only school in the Camas Valley School District.

It became a charter school in 2004.

Academics
In 2008, 82% of the school's seniors received a high school diploma. Of 11 students, nine graduated, one dropped out, and one was still in high school in 2009.

References

High schools in Douglas County, Oregon
Charter schools in Oregon
Public high schools in Oregon
Public middle schools in Oregon
Public elementary schools in Oregon